Djadochtatherioidea is a group of extinct mammals known from the upper Cretaceous of Central Asia. They were members of an also extinct order called Multituberculata. These were generally somewhat rodent-like creatures, who scurried around during the "age of the dinosaurs", though nonetheless very ecologically diverse; several were jerboa-like hoppers, while others like Mangasbaatar were large sized and fossorial. Unusually for multituberculates, some of this group are represented by very good remains. All upper Cretaceous Mongolian multituberculates are included with one exception, the genus Buginbaatar.

This superfamily is further subdivided into two families and several other genera, as listed in the table. These djadochs are within the suborder of Cimolodonta.  
Djadochtatherioidea was established by Kielan-Jaworowska and Hurum in 2001 as a replacement for the previously proposed Djadochtatheria (Kielan-Jaworowska & Hurum, 1997).

References 

 Kielan-Jaworowska Z. & Hurum J.H. (2001), "Phylogeny and Systematics of multituberculate mammals." Paleontology 44, p. 389-429.
 Much of this information has been derived from  MESOZOIC MAMMALS; Djadochtatherioidea, an Internet directory.

Cimolodonts